†Filholiidae is an extinct family of fossil air-breathing land snails, terrestrial pulmonate gastropod mollusks in the superfamily Clausilioidea (according to the taxonomy of the Gastropoda by Bouchet & Rocroi, 2005).

Genera 
Genera within the genus Filholiidae include:
 Filholia, the type genus
 Triptychia Sandberger, 1876

References

 R. B. Salvador, M. W. Rasser, and O. Höltke. 2015. Fossil gastropods from Miocene Lake Randeck Maar and its hinterland (SW Germany). Neues Jahrbuch für Geologie und Paläontologie, Abhandlungen 277(3):251-273